Mohammad Reza Honarmand (born 1955 in Tehran) is an Iranian film director, screenwriter and producer.

Directing in Cinema
Honarmand has directed films in various genres . In dozd-e arousak-ha, Mohammad Reza Honarmand experienced a film with an attractive content that was for children. 
In 1994 he made a war film named didar. Mehran Modiri (the most famous comedy director in Iran) acted his first cinema role there. Since then, Honarmand came to comedy films. mard-e avazi and moomiyaee 3 are two comedy films by him. 
Mard-e avazi (Starring Parviz Parastui) became a successful film among the people of Iran in its own times.

Activities in TV 
Mohammad Reza Honarmand is also active in TV . His comedy-political TV series (Cactus) was praised by Iraninian critics. 
Zir-e tigh is the name of Honarmand's last work that is titled a masterpiece after its attendance in Rome television programs festival. In this festival, Mohammad Reza Honarmand won the award of the best director for TV programs for his masterpiece, Zir-e tigh .

Filmography as Director

Cinema
1982: marg-e digari (in English : Another Death)
1984: gourkan (The Badger)
1985: zang-ha (The Bells)
1987: radd-e pa-yi bar shen (Footprint on the Sand)
1989: dozd-e arousak-ha (Dolls Thief)
1994: didar (The Visit)
1999: mard-e avazi (The Wrong Man)
2000: moomiyaee 3 (Mummy III)
2002: azizam man kook nistam (Honey, I am not winded)
2019: Symphony No. 9

TV Series
Cactus 1, 2 and 3
2007: zir-e tigh (Under the Pillory)
2009: Ashpazbashi

References

External links

Mohammad Reza Honarmand in Iranactor (in Persian)

Iranian film directors
Living people
1955 births